The Church of Saint Wenceslaus in Vawkavysk is a Belarusian Catholic church in the Grodno Region. Constructed in 1846–1848, it is now listed as a Belarusian national cultural heritage object.

The first Catholic church in Vawkavysk was built by Vytautas the Great in 1430. It was destroyed during the wars of the 17th century. The new church was constructed in 1846–1848 at the initiative of local priest Jan Lenikovsky. On August 13, 1850, it was consecrated by the Bishop of Vilnius, . In the 1930s, during the Second Polish Republic, it was restored.

Gallery

References

Sources 

Churches in Belarus
Landmarks in Belarus